Delray is an unincorporated community in Hampshire County in the U.S. state of West Virginia. Delray is located in the North River Valley along Delray Road (West Virginia Route 29) between Sedan and Rio. According to the 2000 census, the Delray community has a population of 151.

Delray began a small agricultural community in the late eighteenth century. Its first storekeeper, John McDonald, owned and operated a stave mill and a barrel factory near his residence. The name Delray most likely is a  name derived from Spanish meaning "of the king".

Historic site 
 Richards-Mowery House (c. 1850)

Attractions 
 The Menagerie at Delray - Bed & Brunch, Lick Run Road (CR 11/5)

See also 
 Wacousta Hill

References

Unincorporated communities in Hampshire County, West Virginia
Unincorporated communities in West Virginia